The Ford F-150 Lightning is a battery electric full-size light duty truck unveiled by Ford in May 2021 as part of the fourteenth generation Ford F-Series. The F-150 Lightning began production on April 26, 2022.

History 
 In January 2019, Ford announced the intention to produce a fully-electric light pickup at the 2019 Detroit Auto Show.

In July 2019, Ford tested prototype electric test mules on existing F-150 chassis. Chief engineer for the F-150, Linda Zhang, emphasized at the time that Ford intended to take the "built Ford tough [characteristics of] durability, capability, and productivity and [extend that into] a whole new arena" of electric trucks.

Ford unveiled the truck, and released the model name on May 19, 2021, with production planned for spring of 2022. Ford received 69,500 refundable-deposit orders in the first four days after the announcement.

By late May 2021, Ford had begun discussing other electric trucks beyond the F-series, such as the Expedition and Navigator, which are intended to be underpinned by their full-size EV truck chassis, as well as a smaller chassis which will be used for the Bronco, Explorer, and Aviator.

By June 11, 2021, over 100,000 reservations were made, and Ford announced that the company would offer digital services for subscription revenue that will change car sales from a single-time transaction process.

Ford had received more than 200,000 Lightning reservations for a 3-year backlog by the end of 2021.

The first pickup was manufactured on April 18, 2022, with first delivery on May 26.

In June 2022, Ford announced its intention to restructure its dealership model, including building an e-commerce platform where customers can buy EVs at non-negotiable prices in an effort to match Tesla’s profit margins. Ford also stated that it would spend $3.7 billion to hire 6,200 union workers to staff several assembly plants in Michigan, Ohio and Missouri in a bid to sell 2 million EVs a year by 2026.

Since launching in May 2021, the 2023 Base Lightning Pro model jumped in price from $41,669 to $48,769 (including a $1,795 destination fee) whereas the top Platinum grades increased $6,100 to $98,669.

Description 
The base configuration has ,  range, and its smaller battery supports a  payload. All models have  of torque, full-time 4wd, independent rear suspension, and will initially come in a crew-cab configuration only, with a  bed. The active suspension provides real-time load weighing function. Like Tesla, the Ford F-150 Lightning is announced to include over-the-air software updates, and a significant software driving aids which will allow limited hands-off highway driving, but fall short of full self-driving. The F-150 Lightning in some trim packages, in concert with the "80A Ford Charge Station pro with Ford Intelligent Backup Power capability," can provide household-oriented V2G power, which can meet the electrical needs of a typical American home for three to ten days. The truck can also supply up to 9.6 kW of power through up to eleven 120V and 240V electrical outlets distributed around the truck.

This electric truck has a standard battery and can travel  on a single charge.

The Ford F-150 Lightning was also evaluated to reach  in 4.5 seconds.

The F-150 Lightning is produced at the new Ford Rouge Electric Vehicle Center in Michigan, and involves two other plants: the Van Dyke Electric Powertrain Center in Sterling Heights, Michigan which will assemble the electric motors and the Rawsonville Components Plant in Ypsilanti, Michigan will produce the batteries.

Trim levels 

For the 2022 model year, the F-150 Lightning is available in four trim levels: Pro, XLT, Lariat, and Platinum. The Pro trim is only available with the smaller-capacity battery, and the Platinum only offers the higher-capacity battery, although all other trims include the smaller-capacity battery as standard equipment, but also offer the higher-capacity battery as an option.

The base Pro trim is comparable to the XL trim of the regular F-150. Standard equipment includes a vinyl-trimmed interior, vinyl flooring, a 12-inch Ford SYNC 4A touchscreen infotainment system, eighteen-inch on/off-road all-terrain tires and machined-face aluminum-alloy wheels, a keyless entry keypad on the front driver's door, and full power equipment.

The mid-level XLT trim adds comfort and convenience features onto the base Pro trim, such as cloth seating surfaces, carpeted flooring with front and rear floor mats, a center LED light bar above the front "grille", and integrated side steps.

The luxury-oriented Lariat trim adds luxury amenities onto the mid-level XLT trim, such as twenty-inch on/off-road all-terrain tires and machined-face aluminum-alloy wheels, perforated luxury leather-trimmed seating surfaces, a 15.5-inch tablet-style Ford SYNC 4A touchscreen infotainment system, a Bang and Olufsen eight-speaker audio system, dual heated and ventilated front bucket seats, a heated leather-wrapped steering wheel, and color-keyed exterior door handles and side mirror caps.

The top-tier Platinum trim adds features onto the luxury-oriented Lariat trim, such as a higher-capacity battery, an upgraded front "grille", 22-inch all-season tires and machined-face aluminum-alloy wheels, the Tow Technology Package, the Max Trailer Tow Package, the Ford BlueCruise semi-autonomous driving system, "Nirvana" perforated luxury leather-trimmed seating surfaces, a twin-panel panoramic moonroof, and a Bang and Olufsen Unleashed eighteen-speaker amplified surround sound audio system.

See also 
 GMC Hummer EV
 Lordstown Endurance
Plug-in electric vehicles in the United States
 Rivian R1T
 Tesla Cybertruck
 Chevrolet Silverado EV

References

External links 
 

Electric concept cars
Ford F-Series
Ford Motor Company
Pickup trucks
Electric trucks